The Pilgrim Travelers were an American gospel group, popular in the late 1940s and early 1950s.

Musical career
Formed in 1936 in Houston, Texas, United States, they were influenced by another Texas-based quartet, the Soul Stirrers. They achieved popularity after moving to Los Angeles in 1942, where their new manager, J. W. Alexander, helped fashion a new style that went beyond imitating the Soul Stirrers and the Golden Gate Quartet, the other reigning quartet of the era. Like the Soul Stirrers, the Travelers traded the lead between their two best singers, Kylo Turner, a baritone with the same facility as a note-bending falsetto as R.H. Harris of the Soul Stirrers, and Keith Barber, also nicknamed "Doc" or "Crip", who changed from being a sweet-voiced tenor to a hard gospel shouter under Alexander's direction. They added Jesse Whitaker — whom Ray Charles credited as one of his models when he adapted hard gospel style to secular themes to create soul music in the 1950s — as a baritone in 1947.

Alexander also changed the Travelers' performance style from the "flat-footed" style of early quartets to the church-wrecking style of other groups of their era. The singers would punctuate their singing by jumping off stage and running up the aisles in order, in Alexander's words, "to pull the sisters out of their seats". They cemented their popularity with a series of "mother songs", which replayed the same themes of gratitude and guilt for all that mother had done to steer them toward salvation.

After a handful of a cappella songs, the Travelers began recording their material with a microphone picking up the sound of their percussive foot-tapping; Specialty's early press for the group proclaimed "Something New — Walking Rhythm Spirituals," and the unique sound quickly caught on with consumers. In 1948, the group issued six singles; after just three the following year.  In 1950, Specialty released ten Pilgrim Travelers sides, all of them to strong sales (particularly "Jesus Met the Woman at the Well" and "Mother Bowed"). However, at the peak of their success, Barber was involved in a 1950 auto accident which left his voice ravaged; at the same time, the emergence of the Soul Stirrers' Sam Cooke made Turner's vocal style appear increasingly outdated.

The Travelers gradually fell apart in the 1950s, however, as accidents and drinking caused both Barber and Turner to leave the group. While the group continued to tour and record, adding Lou Rawls in late 1950s, it lost its hit making power after leaving Specialty Records in 1956. Rawls left the group in 1960; although he returned to record another album with the group after that, it soon faded from the scene. Shortly after Lou Rawls separated from the Travelers, Ben Peters stepped in and continued to be an active member of what was left of the group.

Further reading
 Boyer, Horace Clarence,How Sweet the Sound: The Golden Age of Gospel Elliott and Clark, 1995, .

References

External links
Short profile of the Pilgrim Travelers
Another short profile of the Pilgrim Travelers 
AllMusic resource for information on albums, songs, and other information on the Pilgrim Travelers

American gospel musical groups
Musical groups from Houston
Musical groups established in the 1930s